Fredericton is the capital city of New Brunswick, Canada.

Fredericton may also refer to:

 Fredericton (electoral district), in New Brunswick
 Fredericton (provincial electoral district), in New Brunswick
 Fredericton, Prince Edward Island
 , several Canadian warships
 Silver King Camp, abandoned mine that grew into the ghost town Fredericton

See also